The  Dresden Kreuzkirche (Church of the Holy Cross) is a Lutheran church in Dresden, Germany. It is the main church and seat of the Landesbischof of the Evangelical-Lutheran Church of Saxony, and the largest church building in the Free State of Saxony. It also is home of the Dresdner Kreuzchor boys' choir.

History

A Romanesque basilica dedicated to Saint Nicholas had existed at the southeastern corner of the Dresden market since the twelfth century. A Side-chapel of the Cross, named after a relic bequeathed by the Meissen margravine Constance of Babenberg (1212–1243), was first mentioned in 1319. Over the decades, it became the name of the whole church, which was officially dedicated on 10 June 1388 to the Holy Cross.

From 1401 it was rebuilt as a hall church with a prominent westwork in the German Sondergotik style. Based on the architectural works by Peter Parler (1330–1399), the construction later served as a model for numerous church buildings in Upper Saxony such as St. Anne's Church, Annaberg-Buchholz or St. Wolfgang's Church, Schneeberg. Finished about 1447/49, the church burned down in 1491, the first of five blazes over the next centuries. The Wettin electors of Saxony, residing at Dresden since 1464, had the Gothic hall church rebuilt, from 1499 under the architectural direction of Conrad Pflüger. From 1579 until 1584 the westwork was restored in a Renaissance style.

The church was heavily damaged by Prussian cannonade during the Seven Years' War, with its Late Gothic choir almost completely destroyed. After the war, the Dresden master builder Johann George Schmidt (1707–1774) set up plans for a Baroque reconstruction, which however were opposed by contemporary architects of the Neoclassicist school following Zacharias Longuelune (1669–1748). Prince Francis Xavier of Saxony backed Schmidt and laid the foundation stone in 1764, nevertheless, after the preserved westwork collapsed in 1765, Schmidt had to accept the Neoclassicist chief architect Friedrich August Krubsacius (1718–1789) as adviser. Choir and steeple were accomplished in 1788, the new church was consecrated in 1792 and construction works finished in 1800.

After the building was gutted by a fire in 1897, the church interior was reshaped with Art Nouveau (Jugendstil) elements according to plans designed by the Dresden architects Schilling & Graebner including works by Hans Hartmann-MacLean. The Church of the Cross was again set on fire during the bombing of Dresden on 13 February 1945. In its current form with its sober scratch coat interior, it was re-opened in 1955. In the course of the reconstruction of the nearby Frauenkirche a debate arose over a restoration of the pre-war design, however, from 2000 to 2004, the interior was refurbished in its 1955 condition.

The director of the choir is known as the Kreuzkantor. Roderich Kreile is the twenty-eighth Kreuzkantor since the Reformation.

Kreuzkantors 
Since the Reformation:

1540–1553  Sebaldus Baumann
1553–1560  Johannes Selner
1560–1561  Andreas Lando
1561–1585  Andreas Petermann
1585–1586  
1586–1589  Basilius Köhler
1589–1606  Bartholomäus Petermann
1606–1612  Christoph Lisberger
1612–1615  Samuel Rüling
1615–1625  Christoph Neander
1625–1654  Michael Lohr
1654–1694  Jacob Beutel
1694–1713  Basilius Petritz
1713–1720  Johann Zacharias Grundig
1720–1755  Theodor Christlieb Reinhold
1755–1785  Gottfried August Homilius
1785–1813  Christian Ehregott Weinlig
10 August – 24 October 1813  Gottlob August Krille
1814–1817  Christian Theodor Weinlig
1818–1822  Hermann Uber
1822–1828  Friedrich Wilhelm Aghte
1828–1875  Ernst Julius Otto
1876–1906  Friedrich Oskar Wermann
1906–1930  Otto Richter
1930–1971  Rudolf Mauersberger
1971–1991  Martin Flämig
1991–1994  Gothart Stier
1994–1996  Matthias Jung (provisional)
1997–2022  Roderich Kreile
2022–

Buried in the church
Gregory of Heimburg

Literature 
 Karlheinz Blaschke: Dresden, Kreuzkirche, Kreuzschule, Kreuzchor – musikalische und humanistische Tradition in 775 Jahren. Gütersloh/München 1991,  
 Dieter Härtwig, Matthias Herrmann: Der Dresdner Kreuzchor – Geschichte und Gegenwart, Wirkungsstätten und Schule, Evangelische Verlagsanstalt Leipzig 2006, 
 Jürgen Helfricht: Dresdner Kreuzchor und Kreuzkirche. Eine Chronik von 1206 bis heute. Husum 2004, 
 Jürgen Helfricht: Dresden und seine Kirchen. Evangelische Verlagsanstalt Leipzig 2005,  
 Hans John: Der Dresdner Kreuzchor und seine Kantoren. Berlin 1987,

References

External links 

 Kreuzkirche Dresden
 Dresdner Kreuzchor
 Evangelisches Kreuzgymnasium
 Pictures

Peter Parler buildings
Lutheran churches in Dresden
Dresden Cross
Dresden Cross
Dresden Cross
Dresden Cross
Dresden Kreuz
Articles containing video clips